The Stewart Manor station is one of five stations of the Long Island Rail Road that serve the village of Garden City, New York. It is located just south of Stewart Avenue, to the west of New Hyde Park Road. Contrary to its name, the station is not within the limits of the village of Stewart Manor. The village is just a few blocks to the west. There is ample permit parking available at the station.

History
Originally, the station was built in June 1873 as "Hyde Park", and served as one of the stations of the Central Railroad of Long Island, or "Stewart's Central Railroad", a commuter railroad that village founder Alexander Turney Stewart envisioned to provide transportation across the village. The station closed in October 1876, but was reopened by the LIRR in June 1878 as "Hyde Park Central" station, only to be abandoned on April 30, 1879. The station was reopened again as "Stewart Manor Station" in 1909, and included such features as a "foot subway", crossing gates at New Hyde Park Road, and an "SW Cabin" for controlling manual block signals between Floral Park and Garden City. In 1915, the station was a flag stop. The entrances to the "foot subway" which can be found east of Roosevelt Street on both Manor Road and Plaza Road, were remodeled at some point, and the station in general was remodeled in 2006. There is a ticket machine available in the waiting room as well as on the east side of the station house.

As of August 31, 2016, the station house has been closed for renovations. This includes new windows, doors, walls, benches, ceiling, new LED lighting, air conditioning and security cameras. Complete rehabilitation of the underpass and new station signage is also included in the renovation. After the new station house was completed in 2018, the Stewart Manor station underwent further renovations as part of the Enhanced Station Initiative. The platform decks were replaced as part of the project. Other updates included Wi-Fi, security cameras, improved lighting, new artwork, and Help Point intercoms.

Station layout
This station has two high-level side platforms, each 10 cars long.

Image gallery

References

External links

1957 Photo with old Sheltered Platform (TrainsAreFun.com)
1918 Photo, before double-tracking (Arrt's Arrchives)
 Station House from Google Maps Street View
Platforms from Google Maps Street View
Temporary waiting room from Google Maps Street View

Garden City, New York
Long Island Rail Road stations in Nassau County, New York
Railway stations in the United States opened in 1873
1873 establishments in New York (state)
Railway stations closed in 1876
Railway stations in the United States opened in 1878
Railway stations closed in 1879
Railway stations in the United States opened in 1909
1876 disestablishments in New York (state)
1878 establishments in New York (state)
1879 disestablishments in New York (state)
1909 establishments in New York (state)